The 2023 Georgia Southern Eagles football team will represent Georgia Southern University during the 2023 NCAA Division I FBS football season. The Eagles play their home games at Paulson Stadium in Statesboro, Georgia, and competed in the East Division of the Sun Belt Conference. The team is coached by second-year Head Coach Clay Helton.

Previous season

The Eagles finished the 2022 season  6–7, 3–5 in conference play, finishing fourth in the East Division.

Preseason

Recruiting class

|}
Source:

Schedule 
The football schedule was announced February 24, 2023.

References

Georgia Southern
Georgia Southern Eagles football seasons
Georgia Southern Eagles football